Carl Friedrich Wilhelm Claus  (2 January 1835 – 18 January 1899) was a German zoologist and anatomist. He was an opponent of the ideas of Ernst Haeckel.

Biography 
Claus studied at the University of Marburg and the University of Gießen with Rudolf Leuckart. He worked at the university of Würzburg. In 1863, he became professor of zoölogy at Marburg, in 1870 at Göttingen
and in 1873 at Vienna. He was head of the oceanographic research station in Trieste and was specialized on marine zoology and there his interest was focused on crustaceans. During his research on cell biology he coined the word phagocyte.

He is known for the fact that Sigmund Freud started his studies on the yet unsolved eel life history.

Works 
Of his numerous works, the following are important:
 Die freilebenden Copepoden (1863);
 Beiträge zur Kenntnis der Ostracoden (1868);
 Grundzüge der Zoölogie (1868) ;
 Ueber den Bau und die Entwicklung der Cumaceen (1870);
 Die Metamorphose der Squilliden (1872);
 Ueber die Entwicklung Organisation und systematische Stellung der Arguliden (1875);
 Lehrbuch der Zoölogie  (6th ed., 1897; trans. into English, under the title of Text-book of Zoölogy, by Claus and Sedgwick, London, 1897 ).

References 

1835 births
1899 deaths
Scientists from Kassel
People from the Electorate of Hesse
German carcinologists
19th-century German zoologists
University of Marburg alumni
University of Giessen alumni
Academic staff of the University of Würzburg
Academic staff of the University of Marburg
Academic staff of the University of Göttingen
Academic staff of the University of Vienna